Cnestrum may refer to:
 Cnestrum (fly), a genus of flies in the family Ephydridae
 Cnestrum (plant), a genus of mosses in the family Dicranaceae